is a Japanese actor who has had roles in numerous TV Asahi Tokusatsu shows, including Kamen Rider Ryuki and Kamen Rider Kabuto, as well as a number of films.

Filmography

Drama
Kamen Rider Ryuki (2003), Goro Yura (Kamen Rider Zolda in Episode 50)
Kamen Rider Ryuki Special: 13 Riders (2003), Goro Yura
Pretty Guardian Sailor Moon (2003), Fake Tuxedo Kamen (Ep. 9)
Sh15uya (live-action TV) (2005), Kengo
Garo (2005), Piano Playing Suicide Victim (Ep. 8)
H2~Kimi to Itahibi (2005), Ootake Fumio
Kamen Rider Kabuto (2007), Masato Mishima (Kamen Rider TheBee in Episode 16; Gryllusworm in Ep. 48 & 49)
Kamen Rider Gaim (2013), Kiyojiro Bando
Death Note (2015 TV series) (2015), Shuichi Aizawa
Zero: Dragon Blood (2017), Edel
Todome no Kiss (2018), Tsuji

Film
Kamen Rider Ryuki: Episode Final (2002)
Shibuya kaidan a.k.a. The Locker (2003)
Shibuya kaidan 2 a.k.a. The Locker 2 (2004)
Sakuramburu hatsu koi no sonata (2004)
Nibanme no kanojo (2004)
School Wars: Hero (2004)
Koibumi-biyori (2004)
Si-sei (2006)
Bandage (2006)
Kamen Rider Kabuto: God Speed Love (2006)
Kyō Kara Hitman (2009)
Higanjima (2010) as Ken
Heisei Riders vs. Showa Riders: Kamen Rider Taisen feat. Super Sentai (2014)
 Futari no Uketorinin (2018)

References

External links

1980 births
Living people
Japanese male actors